Peak Lake is a lake located on Vancouver Island south of Cameron River, Dunsmuir Land District. Its feature type is "Lake - Inland body of standing water".

See also
List of lakes of British Columbia

References

Alberni Valley
Lakes of Vancouver Island
Dunsmuir Land District